Anna Elizabeth Christian (born 6 August 1995) is a Manx racing cyclist, who currently rides for UCI Women's Continental Team . She rode at the 2014 UCI Road World Championships.

Christian became British Junior Road Race Champion in 2013. In October 2014 it was announced that she would join the  team in 2015. She is the sister of fellow racing cyclist Mark Christian. At the 2017 Tour of Wolds, which was part of the National Women's road series, Christian finished second. In 2017 she won the inaugural women's under-23 British National Time Trial Championships on home soil on the Isle of Man.

Major results

2013
 1st  Road race, National Under–18 Road Championships
2017
 1st  Time trial, National Under–23 Road Championships
 2nd Tour of the Wolds

References

External links

1995 births
Living people
Manx female cyclists
People from Douglas, Isle of Man